Jo Anne Hart (born December 29, 1953), better known by her stage name Mother Love, is an American presenter, author, actress, and comedian.

Hart was born one of six siblings and grew up in a Cleveland, Ohio, housing project. Her first job was as a school bus driver. She began her career in stand-up comedy in Columbus, Ohio. From 1998 to 2000, Mother Love was the original host of syndicated television's Forgive or Forget. In addition, she hosted radio shows in Los Angeles on KLSX, KBIG, KACE-FM, and a show on KFI.  She appeared in  Volcano, Mr. Nanny, and 10 other films.

Mother Love is the author of three books: Listen Up Girlfriends; Forgive or Forget: Never Underestimate the Power of Forgiveness; and Half the Mother Twice the Love: My Journey to Better Health with Diabetes. She was a co-host for dLife, which was seen Sundays on CNBC from 2005 to 2013.  She is a spokesperson for the American Diabetes Association's (ADA) "I Decide to Fight Diabetes" Campaign and was tapped to be spokesperson for the ADA's new "Choose to Live" program. She is a former spokesperson for Glucerna snacks, shakes and cereals. Mother Love traveled the country with Novo Nordisk, Inc., sponsoring her "Mother Love Presents Diabetes Awareness" tour.

References

External links
 

Living people
Writers from Cleveland
American radio personalities
American television personalities
African-American actresses
African-American female comedians
American women comedians
American film actresses
21st-century African-American people
21st-century African-American women
1953 births